The 2004 WNBA season was the eighth season for the Charlotte Sting. The team fell short for the WNBA Playoffs for the first time in four years, falling a game short to the Washington Mystics.

Offseason

Dispersal Draft
Based on the Sting's 2003 record, they would pick 9th in the Cleveland Rockers dispersal draft. The Sting picked Mery Andrade.

WNBA Draft

Transactions
February 5: The Sting traded Kelly Miller and their 9th pick in the 2004 WNBA Draft to the Fever in exchange for Indiana's 3rd and 18th picks in the 2004 WNBA Draft.
March 1: The Sting signed Andrea Stinson to a contract extension
March 12: The Sting signed Olympia Scott-Richardson.
March 18: The Sting signed Kara Wolters.
April 5: The Sting signed Sophia Witherspoon.
April 21: The Sting signed Telisha Quarles, Lenae Williams, Latoya Davis, and Cristina Ciocan.
April 25: The Sting signed La'Keshia Frett.
April 27: The Sting waived Lenae Williams.
April 30: The Sting waived Telisha Quarles.
May 4: The Sting waived Cristina Ciocan.
May 6: The Sting waived Latoya Davis and signed Tera Bjorklund.
May 11: The Sting waived Latoya Turner.
May 12: The Sting waived Kara Wolters.
May 17: The Sting waived Sophia Witherspoon and signed Rita Williams.
May 19: The Sting waived Jenni Benningfield, Rita Williams, Marla Brumfield, and Tera Bjorklund.

Regular season

Season standings

Season schedule

Player stats

References

Charlotte Sting seasons
Charlotte
Charlotte Sting